Jean Chapot (15 November 1930 – 10 April 1998) was a French screenwriter and film director who began his career as an actor. In 1972, he was awarded the Short Film Palme d'Or for his film Le fusil à lunette at the 25th Cannes Film Festival.

Selected filmography
 Heaven on One's Head (1965)
 La Voleuse (1966)
 The Burned Barns (1973)

External links
 

1930 births
1998 deaths
French film directors
French male film actors
French male screenwriters
People from Seine-Maritime
Writers from Normandy
20th-century French male actors
20th-century French screenwriters
20th-century French male writers